Silent but Deadly is a Canadian 2011 horror comedy film starring Kim Poirier, Jason Mewes, and William Sadler. It is a MJC Entertainment Inc production. It premiered on the Canadian TV channel Super Channel on November 11, 2011.

Plot
A mute, illiterate Louisiana farmer's son with an extreme fondness for goats becomes a serial killer who goes after anyone who hurts goats, and wreaks havoc on an unsuspecting film crew shooting a film in the area. His method of killing is passing gas (farting) that is poisonous to his victims. The farts do not make any sound thus the name of the movie, Silent But Deadly. A subplot involves a small crew following a sheriff investigating the murders.

Cast
 Jason Mewes as Thomas Capper
 William Sadler as John Capper
 Kim Poirier as Sandra Gibson
 Jordan Prentice as Sheriff Shelby
 Nicole Arbour as Jackie
 Patrick McKenna as Victor
 R.D. Reid as Ed
 Benz Antoine as Deputy Jimbo
 Marc Hickox as Bobby
 Vanessa Burns as Anya
 Jai Jai Jones as Winston
 Aaron Walpole as Rob
 Anand Rajaram as Kyle
 Michael Majeski as Stan
 Rebeka Coles-Budrys as Titianna
 Jesse Powell as Set PA

References

External links
 

English-language Canadian films
Films shot in Ontario
Canadian horror television films
2011 comedy horror films
Canadian comedy horror films
2011 films
2010s Canadian films